The Sellwood Masonic Lodge is an historic building in Portland, Oregon's Sellwood neighborhood, in the United States.

Design and history
Designed by Francis Marion Stokes, the building was put on the market with a $1.95 million asking price in 2008.

The Ancient Free and Accepted Masons, Sellwood Lodge #131 group of Masons was proposed in 1907 and formally organized in 1908.

The building is a three-story brick-faced structure built in 1930.

In 2018, the building at 7126 SE Milwaukie Ave. is home of the Little Village Montessori school.

References

1930 establishments in Oregon
Buildings and structures completed in 1930
Buildings and structures in Portland, Oregon
Masonic buildings in Oregon
Sellwood-Moreland, Portland, Oregon